Vincent Fuller may refer to:

Vincent Fuller (American football) (born 1982), American football player
Vincent J. Fuller (1931–2006), American lawyer